Tachi Palace Fights 10 was a mixed martial arts event held by Tachi Palace Fights (TPF), on August 5, 2011 at the Tachi Palace Hotel and Casino in Lemoore, California.

Background
Former TPF Featherweight Champion Isaac De Jesus was scheduled to take on Eddie Yagin in a bout for the vacant title, but it was announced on May 27, 2011 that former Bellator Featherweight Champion Joe Soto was to replace De Jesus because of a failed drugs test and subsequent suspension following TPF 9. The bout was still for the title.

On July 15, an undisclosed injury forced Andre Galvao out of his fight with Jorge Lopez.Strikeforce veteran David Marshall stepped in as Galvao's replacement.

TPF middleweight champion David Loiseau was originally slated to face Giva Santana, but had to pull out of the fight due to an undisclosed injury requiring surgery. Former WEC champion Doug Marshall took his place. He faced Santana in a middleweight non-title bout. The event was notable in that the free live stream provided on Sherdog.com was of unusually low quality, freezing for minutes at a time. As a result of this, a meme has started, dubbing TPF 10 as "Let the Stream Fail", rather than the events actual name,"Let the Chips Fall".

Results

References

Tachi Palace Fights events
2011 in mixed martial arts
Mixed martial arts in California
Sports in Lemoore, California
2011 in sports in California